Teen Mom 2  is an American reality television series that premiered January 11, 2011, on MTV. It is the second spin-off of 16 and Pregnant.

Series overview

Episodes

Season 1 (2011)

Season 2 (2011–12)

Season 3 (2012–13)

Season 4 (2013)

Season 5 (2014)

Season 6 (2015)

Season 7 (2016–17)

Season 8 (2017–18)

Season 9 (2019)

Season 10 (2020–21)

Season 11 (2022)

Specials

References

External links 

Lists of American non-fiction television series episodes